Raorchestes signatus is a species of frog in the family Rhacophoridae.
It is endemic to the Western Ghats, India.

Its natural habitats are subtropical or tropical moist montane forests and heavily degraded former forest.
It is threatened by habitat loss.

References

External links

Frogs of India
signatus
Endemic fauna of the Western Ghats
Taxonomy articles created by Polbot
Amphibians described in 1882